

The Aviatik B.III was a reconnaissance aircraft built in Austria-Hungary during World War I. Aviatik's Austro-Hungarian subsidiary had built the German-designed B.II, and now further developed this design by adding a more powerful engine and armament in the form of a defensive machine gun and bomb racks. It was otherwise similar to Austro-Hungarian built B.IIs, incorporating the revisions that had been made locally to the original design. All were obsolete and out of service by the end of 1916.

Operators

Austro-Hungarian Imperial and Royal Aviation Troops

Specifications

References
 

1910s Austro-Hungarian military reconnaissance aircraft
B.III
Aircraft first flown in 1916